Cemre Shipyard is a shipyard in Altınova, on the shore of the Sea of Marmara in Yalova Province, Turkey. Established in 2005, they now specialise in low- and zero-emission, battery and hybrid vessels for the world market.

History
Cemre signed the first shipbuilding contract with Havyard Group in  2005 and delivered Havila Mars the following year, from a rented yard. They developed their own facilities in Altınova and expanded quickly, reaching 78.000 m2 by 2009. A second slipway was built in 2012 and a further 78.000 m2 shipyard, Cemre II was added in 2015. Cemre has constructed over 50 hulls which were then fitted out by Havyard Ship Technology (HST) in Leirvik, Norway.

The first fishing vessel, Østerbris was delivered in 2014. Cemre moved into construction of passenger vessels, with the delivery of Bastø VI in 2016. Offshore support vessels followed, with specialisation in windfarm support vessels and low- and zero-emission, battery and hybrid vessels.

Windfarm support vessels
Cemre Shipyard entered the windfarm market in 2014, when they were selected to build one Service Operations Vessel (SOV) for Danish company, Esvagt, Esvagt Mercator. This was followed by Wind of Change for French ship-owner Louis Dreyfus Armateurs. Wind of Change is equipped with a Heave Compensated Gangway (providing continuous access to the turbines), a 3D Crane, helideck and a side boat landing. Delivered in April 2019, she operates for Ørsted in German waters. She has a DP system and an innovative DC grid developed by ABB.

Groenewind is the first DP2, twin-hulled SOV in the world. She serves offshore wind farms in Belgium.

Low emission ferries
Scandlines ordered the world's largest zero-emission ferry, with 10 MWh battery capacity.

Danish ferry operator Molslinjen ordered two new electric ferries.

Norwegian ferry company Torghatten Nord AS contracted Cemre Shipyard to build a zero-emission, battery-electric ferry.

References

External links
Cemre Shipyard

Shipyards of Turkey